Tianjin is one of the four direct-controlled municipalities of the People's Republic of China, and is further divided into 16 districts.

In addition, the Tianjin Economic and Technological Development Area (TEDA) is not a formal level of administration, but nevertheless enjoys rights similar to a regular district.

Administrative divisions
All of these administrative divisions are explained in greater detail at Administrative divisions of the People's Republic of China. This chart lists only county-level divisions of Tianjin.

Recent changes in administrative divisions

Historical divisions

ROC (1911–1949)

References

Geography of Tianjin
Tianjin